Louis Scoffic (May 20, 1913 – August 28, 1997) was an American professional baseball player who appeared in four games as a right fielder and pinch runner in Major League Baseball for the  St. Louis Cardinals.

Born in Herrin, Illinois, Scoffic played 12 seasons of pro ball (1933 through 1944), all of them in the Cardinal organization. He also managed in the Redbird system during all or parts of the 1940 and 1942 minor-league seasons.

His MLB "cup of coffee" occurred during April of 1936. In his debut, on the 16th, he was the Cardinals' starting right fielder at Sportsman's Park in their third game of the campaign. Facing left-hander Larry French of the Chicago Cubs, Scoffic had two singles in four at bats, as the Cardinals fell, 5–3. Six days later, Scoffic went one for three, with a base on balls and two runs batted in, as St. Louis' starting right fielder against the Cincinnati Reds at Crosley Field; it was another losing effort, however, as the Cardinals fell, 7–6. After those two games, Scoffic never had another plate appearance in the majors; in his final two games, he was a pinch runner (scoring two runs) and defensive replacement.

Lou Scoffic died at age 84 in his home town of Herrin in August 1997.

References

External links

1913 births
1997 deaths
Baseball players from Illinois
Bloomington Bloomers players
Columbus Red Birds players
Decatur Commodores players
Fresno Cardinals players
Greensburg Trojans players
Houston Buffaloes players
Huntington Red Birds players
Major League Baseball outfielders
Minor league baseball managers
Mobile Shippers players
New Orleans Pelicans (baseball) players
People from Herrin, Illinois
Rochester Red Wings players
Sacramento Solons players
St. Louis Cardinals players
Springfield Senators players